Nigār is a Pakistan-based entertainment magazine published weekly from its head office in Karachi, Sindh, Pakistan.

History and profile
Nigar was the brainchild of Ilyas Rashidi, also known as the 'Pioneer of Film Journalism' in Pakistan. Ilyas Rashidi acquired experience in entertainment journalism through his association with Umer Azad (his older brother) and his daily newspaper Anjum, which had shifted its offices from Delhi to Karachi in 1947. Ilyas had been inspired by Filmfare magazine and thus purchased a children's magazine Monthly Nigar from his friend Ibne Hassan Nigar, and re-branded it as a weekly film magazine. In 1957, the Nigar Awards were founded, as an extension of Nigar magazine.

The magazine has news and feature articles relating to Pakistani cinema, and recently, it has added Pakistani dramas as well. The magazine includes extensive photography of actors and actresses.

References

Film magazines
Magazines established in 1948
Magazines published in Pakistan
Weekly magazines published in Pakistan
Mass media in Karachi
Urdu-language magazines